Vasospastic macules are a skin condition due to localized vasoconstriction and are seen most often in young women.

See also 
 Nevus anemicus
 List of cutaneous conditions

References 

Disturbances of human pigmentation